Aurelia Greene (October 26, 1934 – May 8, 2021) represented District 77 in the New York State Assembly, which comprises the Highbridge, Morrisania, and Morris Heights sections of The Bronx. She had been representing her district since 1982.  She resigned in April 2009 to become Deputy Bronx Borough President. She retired in December 2017. Her death was announced on May 10, 2021. Greene died on May 8. 2021.

In the Assembly 
She was a member of the New York State Assembly from 1982 to 2009, sitting in the 184th, 185th, 186th, 187th, 188th, 189th, 190th, 191st, 192nd, 193rd, 194th, 195th, 196th, 197th and 198th New York State Legislatures.

Some of her positions within the Assembly included Deputy Majority Leader and Chairwoman of the Assembly Committee on Banks. She was also once the Chairwoman of the Standing Committee on Consumer Affairs & Protection and Subcommittee on Adult Education. She was the Speaker Pro Tempore and the Ranking Member of both the Education Committee and Chairwoman of the Assembly's Bronx delegation. In 2007 she broke with her party and voted against marriage equality for gay and lesbian couples.

Greene served as Deputy Borough President of the Bronx from 2009 to 2017 under Ruben Diaz Jr.

Greene was succeeded by her Chief of Staff Vanessa Gibson. Gibson in 2021, won the Democratic nomination for Bronx Borough President.

Personal life 
Greene graduated from Central Commercial High School.

Aurelia Greene supported neighborhood schooling in 1968 during the Ocean-Hill Brownsville crisis. She lived in the Bronx then.

In March 1990,  Greene, along with her husband and a former Bronx school superintendent, were acquitted of criminal charges "stemming from the removal of a baby grand piano" from a public school adjacent to the house of the Greene family in 1983.

Greene endorsed Eric Adams for Mayor of New York in 2021 Democratic primary.

References

External links 
New York Assembly Member Website
NY Dems Biography.
Gotham Gazette's Eye On Albany: New York State Assembly: District 77
Project Vote Smart Interest group ratings.

1934 births
2021 deaths
Democratic Party members of the New York State Assembly
Women state legislators in New York (state)
Politicians from the Bronx
21st-century American women